Alain Godard was a French screenwriter born on  in Boulogne-Billancourt, France, and who died on  in Paris.

Biography 
Godard was a copywriter at the Publicis agency from 1967 to 1969, managing director of Doyle Dane Bernbach from 1970 to 1976, creative director of Eurocom from 1977 to 1980, creative director (1987-1988) and then CEO (1988-1991) of the Havas Dentsu Marsteller group, and vice-chairman of Euro RSCG from 1991 to 1995.

He is mainly known for his work as a screenwriter.

Filmography 
 1976: Dracula and Son
 1978: Je suis timide mais je me soigne
 1979: Coup de tête
 1980: C'est pas moi, c'est lui
 1981: Quest for Fire
 1983: Signes extérieurs de richesse
 1985: 
 1986: The Name of the Rose
 1994: Wings of Courage
 2001: Enemy at the Gates
 2004: Two Brothers
 2007: 
 2009: 
 2011: Black Gold
 2015: Wolf Totem

References

External links
 

French screenwriters
1944 births
2012 deaths